Reservoir Media, also known as Reservoir Media Management, Reservoir, Reservoir Holdings, Inc.,Reservoir Music Rights Company to List on NASDAQ With $788 Million Valuation", “Variety.com", April 14th, 2021 is an independent music company based in New York City with additional offices in Los Angeles, Nashville, Toronto, London, and Abu Dhabi.

In 2021, 2020, 2019, 2018  and 2017  Reservoir was included in Billboard (magazine)’s  Publisher's Quarterly Top 10 Market Share.

History 
Reservoir was founded in 2007 as a Music Publishing Company by Iranian-Canadian Golnar Khosrowshahi, who is the current CEO. Khosrowshahi was named to Billboard’s Power List in 2020 and 2022, and was honored as one of Billboard’s Most Powerful Female Executives in 2017, 2018 and 2019 and a Billboard Indie Power Player in 2017 and 2018. Additionally, in 2022, Billboard named her the recipient of the Executive of the Year Award at their annual Women In Music Awards. That same year, Khosrowshahi was named to Variety's New York Women's Impact Report 2022.

Khosrowshahi is the daughter of Hassan Khosrowshahi, an investor, and philanthropist, and is the cousin of Dara Khosrowshahi, the current CEO of Uber.

Reservoir owns over 140,000 copyrights and over 36,000 master recordings dating back to the early 1900s.

The publishing catalog includes pieces written and performed by Billy Strayhorn, Hoagy Carmichael, John Denver, Sheryl Crow, Phantogram (band), Lady Gaga, Camila Cabello, Bruno Mars, Cardi B and Thomas McClary (musician) of The Commodores. The company's roster of active writers and producers includes Levi Hummon, James Fauntleroy, Ali Tamposi, and Jamie Hartman.

Reservoir’s collection of film music includes rights to scores to motion pictures The Lion King, the Pirates of the Caribbean series, Gladiator (2000 film) and The Dark Knight (film) Trilogy created by composer-producer Hans Zimmer.

The company expanded in 2010 by acquiring TVT Music Enterprises (its roster including Scott Storch, Lil Jon and The Cinematics), Reverb Music in 2012, P&P Songs in 2013, First State Media Group (from BMG Rights Management) in 2014, Century Media's songwriters in 2017, Chrysalis Records in 2019, Shapiro Bernstein and Atlantic Screen Music  in 2020.

Reservoir also has a partnership with PopArabia, founded by Spek who serves as Reservoir's EVP of International & Emerging Markets.

The company also represents recorded music through Chrysalis Records, Tommy Boy Records, and Philly Groove Records and manages artists with Blue Raincoat Music  and Big Life Management.

Reservoir was named Publisher of the Year Award at Music Business Worldwide’s A&R Awards in 2017 and 2019. The company also won Music Week’s  Independent Publisher of the Year in 2020 and in 2022.

Reservoir’s President  and COO, Rell Lafargue also serves on the board of directors for the Mechanical Licensing Collective (MLC), the Association of Independent Music Publishers (AIMP), and Music Publishers Canada (MPC).

In 2021, Reservoir also became a publicly traded company, listed on the Nasdaq stock exchange under the ticker RSVR. The IPO was the result of a business combination with special-purpose acquisition company Roth CH Acquisition Co. II.

in March 2022, Reservoir acquired rights in the catalog of the film-score composer Henry Jackman.

References 

Companies listed on the Nasdaq
Entertainment companies based in New York City